Thomas Lee (fl. 1420s) was an English politician.

Life
The life, even the exact identity, of this politician is unclear. He had a son named William.

Career
Lee was a Member of Parliament for Newcastle-under-Lyme in December 1421 and 1427.

References

English MPs December 1421
Members of the Parliament of England for Newcastle-under-Lyme
Year of birth missing
Year of death missing
English MPs 1427